William Schneider (born October 8, 1944 in Portsmouth, Virginia) is an American journalist. From 1990 to 2009 he served as CNN's senior political analyst. He is a Distinguished Senior Fellow & Resident Scholar at Third Way, a Washington think tank. Schneider is also serving as the Omer L. and Nancy Hirst Professor at George Mason University's School of Public Policy. He is also currently teaching at George Mason University Schar School of Policy and Government. He has also been a contributing editor to the Opinion section of the Los Angeles Times.

Awards
In 2003, he was awarded the Centennial Medal for contributions to society by the Graduate School of Arts and Sciences at Harvard University. In 2001, he received the Julian P. Kanter Award for Excellence in Television from the American Association of Political Consultants. He is also the recipient of the Brandeis University Pride Award and the Alumni Achievement Award.

In 2009, the International Foundation for Electoral Systems presented Schneider with a special award "for his extensive coverage and keen insight of the 2008 United States presidential elections . . . showcasing democracy in action" to the world.

References

External links
 

1944 births
Living people
American television reporters and correspondents
American newspaper editors
American political journalists
Brandeis University alumni
Harvard University alumni
Harvard University faculty
Woodrow Wilson High School (Portsmouth, Virginia) alumni
CNN people
George Mason University faculty